The 1971 Easthampstead Rural District Council election, held on 11 May 1971, was the last election to Easthampstead Rural District Council.  The Conservative Party lost overall control, emerging narrowly as the largest party.  Concurrent with the changes wrought by the Local Government Act 1972, the council would transition to a new Bracknell District Council, the first election being held in 1973.  Until 2023, this would be the last election for a Bracknell-based council where a majority of seats were outside Bracknell town.

Ward results

Binfield

Garth

Great Hollands-Wildridings

Old Bracknell

References

Easthampstead Rural District Council election
Easthampstead Rural District Council election